Paarakaphi Waterfalls are one of the many waterfalls located in Adilabad district, Telangana, India  It is located near Utnoor.

References

Waterfalls of Telangana